The tepui wren (Troglodytes rufulus) is a species of bird in the family Troglodytidae. It is found in Brazil, Guyana, and Venezuela, where it inhabits high tablelands called tepuis.

Taxonomy and systematics

The tepui wren has often been treated a subspecies of mountain wren (Troglodytes solstitialis). The South American Classification Committee of the American Ornithological Society (SACC/AOS) considers those two, ochraceous wren (T. achraceus), rufous-browed wren (T. rufociliatus), and Santa Marta wren (T. monticola) to be a superspecies.

The tepui wren has six subspecies:

T. r. rufulus Cabanis (1849)
T. r. fulvigularis Zimmer & Phelps (1945)
T. r. yavii Phelps & Phelps Jr. (1949)
T. r. duidae Chapman (1929) 
T. r. wetmorei Phelps & Phelps Jr. (1955)
T. r. marahuacae Phelps Jr. & Aveledo (1984)

Description

The adult's crown and upperparts are chestnut brown that is slightly redder on the lower back and rump. Its tail is dark reddish brown with thin blackish bars. It has a yellowish buff supercilium and a dark brown streak behind the eye. The throat and breast are yellowish buff; the sides, flanks, and lower belly are reddish brown; and the vent area is buffy brown with dark brown bars. The juvenile is darker with scaly underparts. T. r. fulvigularis is darker and less reddish than the nominate. T. r. yavii has white underparts. T. r. duidae has whitish underparts and the bars on its tail are more pronounced. T. r. wetmorei is the most similar to the nominate, differing only by having gray central underparts. T. r. marahuacae is similar to wetmorei but is smaller and the entire belly is gray.

Distribution and habitat

The subspecies of tepui wren are distributed thus:

T. r. rufulus, Mount Roraima and Uei-tepui at the Venezuela-Guyana-Brazil border
T. r. fulvigularis, southeastern Bolívar state, southeastern Venezuela
T. r. yavii, northern Amazonas state, south central Venezuela
T. r. duidae, central Amazonas and southern Bolívar states, southern Venezuela
T. r. wetmorei, Cerro de la Neblina in southern Amazonas state, venezuela, and perhaps adjoining northern Brazil
T. r. marahuacae, central Amazonas state, southern Venezuela

The tepui wren inhabits humid forest, forest edges, and bushland on isolated flat-topped mountains called tepuis.

Behavior

Feeding

The tepui wren primarily forages on the ground or in low vegetation. Its diet has not been documented.

Breeding

No information about the tepui wren's breeding phenology has been published.

Vocalization

The tepui wren's song is "a series of high, thin whistled twitters" that may run together or be in separate phrases.

Status

The IUCN has assessed the tepui wren as being of Least Concern. Though its population has not been quantified, it is locally common and many of the inhabited tepuis are protected preserves.

References 

tepui wren
Birds of the Tepuis
tepui wren
Taxonomy articles created by Polbot